1875 may refer to:

 1875, a number in the 1000 (number) range

Time
 1875 A.D. (MDCCCLXXV), a year in the Common Era
 1875 BC, a year in the Before Common Era

Places
 1875 (1969 QQ) Neruda, the asteroid #1875, see List of minor planets: 1001–2000

Other uses
 B1875.0, the Besselian epoch in astronomy
 Model 1875 (disambiguation)

See also

 
 
 75 (disambiguation)